Kingdom's Fury is the eighth novel of the military science fiction StarFist Saga by American writers David Sherman and Dan Cragg.

This is the second Starfist book taking place largely on the planet called Kingdom, a world with a crazy-quilt religious theocracy involving various flavors of Christians, Muslims, and others.  This book continues where Kingdom's Swords left off.

Plot summary

34th FIST has been reinforced by the 26th FIST, now that the Confederation is aware that this is a full scale Skink invasion.  With the reinforcements, the Marines are now able to go off the defensive and take the battle to the Skinks.  The Skinks have been using a devastating weapon never before seen by the Confederation armed forces, but in this book the Navy figures out what the weapon is, a Rail Gun.  There doesn't appear to be a true defense, but at least there is now a warning when it is about to be used.  The Fist Marines launch a major operation where the Skinks have made a stronghold in the swamps on Kingdom.  Meanwhile, Skink Battle Cruisers are on their way to Kingdom. Having been pushed back from their swamp on Kingdom the Skinks launch a diversion cover their retreat to the Skink fleet.  Up to this point in the Starfist series there have been no portrayals of space Naval battles, but this omission is now rectified.  The Marines and Confederation Navy drive the Skinks off world and push them back to the planet "Quagmire" where they used its natives as slaves and used the planet as a staging area to invade Kingdom.  The 26th and 34th Fist Marines then go to Quagmire and Kill most of the Skinks there, with the help of the Natives.  Also, Marine General Aguinaldo is promoted to come up with an Anti Skink task force.  He has the entire military at his disposal.  There is also a subplot involving the government of Kingdom, as one of the more powerful figures among the Kingdomites takes advantage of the distraction caused by the extensive combat to overthrow the theocracy and establish a fascist-style government.

2003 American novels
American science fiction novels
2003 science fiction novels
StarFist series
Del Rey books